The 1 August 2007 Baghdad bombings occurred on 1 August 2007, when several suicide bombings and car bombings occurred in Baghdad, the capital of Iraq. In one of the attacks, a fuel tanker packed with explosives exploded near a petrol station in the suburb of Mansour. The bombing set fire to ten vehicles at the petrol station killing 50 and wounding 60 in an around the petrol station.

References 

2007 murders in Iraq
August 2007 crimes
August 2007 events in Iraq
Mass murder in 2007
Suicide bombings in Baghdad
Car and truck bombings in Iraq
Terrorist incidents in Iraq in 2007
Terrorist incidents in Baghdad
2000s in Baghdad